Terrorism in Indonesia refer to acts of terrorism that take place within Indonesia or attacks on Indonesian people or interests abroad. These acts of terrorism often target the government of Indonesia or foreigners in Indonesia, most notably Western visitors, especially those from the United States and Australia.

In June 2015, Indonesia was taken off the Financial Action Task Force blacklist of 'Non-Cooperative Countries or Territories' (NCCTs) due to Indonesia no longer being non-cooperative in the global fight against money laundering and terrorist financing. That gives Indonesia the same status as other major economies in the G20.

Suspects
Traditionally militias politically opposed to Indonesian government interests have been held responsible for terrorist attacks in Indonesia. Separatist and violent rebel movements operating in Indonesia, such as the Darul Islam, the Communist Party of Indonesia, Fretilin (East Timorese independence militia during the Indonesian occupation of East Timor), the Free Aceh Movement,  and the Free Papua Organization were often held responsible for terrorist attacks, such as bombings and shooting. Recent terrorism in Indonesia can in part be attributed to the al-Qaeda-affiliated Jemaah Islamiyah Islamist terrorist group and/or Islamic State.

Indonesia has worked with other countries to apprehend and prosecute perpetrators of major bombings linked to militant Islamism. Since 2003, a number of 'western targets' have been attacked. Victims have included both foreigners — mainly Western tourists — as well as Indonesian civilians. Terrorism in Indonesia intensified in 2000 with the Philippine consulate bombing in Jakarta and Jakarta Stock Exchange bombing, followed by four more large attacks. The deadliest killed 202 people (including 164 international tourists) in the Bali resort town of Kuta in 2002. The attacks, and subsequent travel warnings issued by other countries, severely damaged Indonesia's tourism industry and foreign investment prospects. However, after the capture and killing of most of its key members and leaders, most notably Imam Samudra, Amrozi, Abu Dujana, Azahari Husin, and Noordin Mohammad Top, the terrorist cells in Indonesia have become less significant.

Since 2011, terrorist attacks seemed to shift from targeting foreign Western interests and residents to attacking Indonesian police officers. The Indonesian Police had success in cracking down on terrorist cells, and in retaliation a new terrorist cell, identified as the "Cirebon Cell", began targeting police officers. On 15 April 2011 a suicide bomber detonated an improvised explosive device in a mosque in a police compound in the city of Cirebon, West Java, during Friday prayers. The bomber was killed and at least 28 people were injured. The same cell was also suspected of being involved in two more attacks in Solo, the suicide bombing of a church on 25 September 2011, and a shooting targeting police on 17 August 2012. However these attacks were not as well-prepared and high scaled as previous attacks organized by Jemaah Islamiyah.

Although the number of terrorist attacks seem to have reduced in both number and scale, some terrorist hotspots such as Poso, Central Sulawesi, remain. the Poso region was previously marred by religious violence between Muslims and Christians in the area. On 16 October 2012, Police discovered two corpses of murdered police that had been missing for three days in Tamanjeka village, Poso Regency, Central Sulawesi. The victims went missing during an investigatory mission to a suspected terrorist training ground in a forest the Poso area.

Similar attacks targeting the Indonesian authorities, especially police officers, have also occurred in Papua, however these are not linked with Islamist terrorist cells, but rather with the Papuan separatist movement Organisasi Papua Merdeka. On 8 April 2012, a Trigana Air PK-YRF airplane was shot at by unidentified gunmen during a landing approach on Mulia airstrip, Puncak Jaya, Papua. A Papua Pos journalist, Kogoya (35), was killed in this shooting. On 27 November 2012, three policemen stationed at the remote Pirime police post, Jayawijaya, Papua, were killed in an attack by a group of unidentified men. Police suspected the Papua separatist movement was behind the attack.

Political and community responses
Subsequent bombings in the centre of Jakarta, in which all but one victim were ordinary Indonesians, shocked the public and brought swift responses from the Indonesian security forces. Even the most reluctant politicians had to admit that the evidence pointed to a small group of Islamist agitators. The Jakarta bombings and legal prosecutions helped shift public opinion away from the use of extremist Islamic political violence, but also increased the influence of intelligence bodies, the police and military whose strength had diminished since 1998.

Political factors clouded Indonesian responses to the "War on Terror"; politicians were at pains not to be seen to be bowing to US and Australian opinion. Even the term "Jemaah Islamiyah" is controversial in Indonesia as it means "Islamic community/congregation", and was also the subject of previous "New Order" manipulation.

Effects
The attacks, and subsequent travel warnings issued by other countries including the United States and Australia, severely damaged Indonesia's tourism industry and foreign investment prospects. Bali's economy was a particularly hard hit, as were tourism based businesses in other parts of Indonesia. In May 2008, the United States government decided to lift its warning. In 2006, 227,000 Australians visited Indonesia and in 2007 this rose to 314,000.

Counter-terrorism
Detachment 88 is the Indonesian counter-terrorism squad, and part of the Indonesian National Police. Formed after the 2002 Bali bombings, the unit has had considerable success against the jihadi terrorist cells linked to the Central Java-based Islamist movement Jemaah Islamiah.

Within three months after the 2002 Bali bombing, various militants, including the attack's mastermind Imam Samudra, the notorious 'smiling-bomber' Amrozi, and many others were apprehended. Samudra, Amrozi, and Amrozi's brother Ali Ghufron were executed by firing squad on November 9, 2008.

On November 10, 2005, bomb expert and senior player in Jemaah Islamiah, Malaysian Dr Azahari Husin, along with two other militants were killed in a raid on a house in Malang, East Java.

The police forces uncovered JI's new command structure in March 2007 and discovered a weapons depot in Java in May 2007. Abu Dujana, suspected leader of JI's military wing and its possible emir, was apprehended on June 9, 2007.

By May 2008, Indonesian police had arrested 418 suspects, of which approximately 250 had been tried and convicted. According to sources within Detachment 88, the JI organisation had been "shrunk", and many of its top operatives had been arrested or killed.

On July 17, 2009, two blasts ripped two Jakarta hotels, JW Marriott and Ritz-Carlton, killing seven. It was the first serious attack for the country in five years. The police stated that it was committed by a more radical splinter group of JI, led by the man then dubbed as the most wanted terrorist in Southeast Asia, Noordin Mohammad Top. Top was killed in a raid two months later on September 17, 2009, in Solo, Central Java. All members of his cell were either killed or captured, including the recruiter and field coordinator of the attack, Ibrohim, killed on August 12, 2009, and the one said to be his successor, Syaifudin Zuhri, killed on October 9, 2009. After Top, many believed that terrorism in Indonesia had run out of charismatic leaders, and grew insignificant. According to South East Asian terrorism expert and director of the South East Asia International Crisis Group, Sidney Jones, Top's death was "a huge blow for the extremist organizations in Indonesia and the region".

On March 9, 2010, Dulmatin, a senior figure in the militant group Jemaah Islamiyah (JI) and one of the most wanted terrorists in Southeast Asia was killed in a police raid in Pamulang, Jakarta by Detachment 88.

In May 2018, The House of Representatives (DPR) and the government agreed to ratify the draft revision of Law Number 15 of 2013 concerning the Eradication of Criminal Acts of Terrorism (the Anti-terrorism Bill) into law. Previously, police have to wait for members of the suspected terror organisation to commit terrorism, in order to arrest them. The new anti-terrorism law gave the government the authority to identify and submit an organisation as a terrorist organisation to the court. In this new law, the membership to a terrorist cells or terrorist organisation groups, that have been established by the court, is enough to arrest and persecute a terrorist suspect, thus enabled the authority to perform preemptive measures prior to the terrorist attacks. Since then, the JAD (Jamaah Ansharut Daulah), JI (Jemaah Islamiyah), has been submitted as active terrorist groups in Indonesia, which membership to either of these organisation will be prosecuted immediately by Indonesian law.

List of attacks

References

 
Indonesia